Clients is the second studio album by American heavy metal band The Red Chord. It was released on May 17, 2005 via Metal Blade Records.

Concept
The title of the album was originally derived from an in-joke and story between Guy Kozowyk's family and friends, referring to the mentally disabled students for whom a member of Kozowyk's family drove a bus. This term eventually spread out to mean anybody for whom one provided service. The title reflects the songs, as the songs are stories from and about "clients", or mentally disabled people, with whom Kozowyk has had experience working in a convenience store located next to a psychiatric rehabilitation/hospital.

Each song is a different "client", or a different person with a mental ailment, ranging from schizophrenia, to multiple personality disorder, to extreme obsessive compulsive disorder. The song "Black Santa" would best describe the album and its meanings, as it actually depicts everything that is used as an inspiration in the album: Kozowyk's job, the people he encountered, the stories he heard, and the notion that everybody both has and is a "client", meaning everybody works for somebody, and that everybody is not entirely mentally stable.

Music videos
The Red Chord released four music videos and singles from Clients. "Antman", the first single, was directed by David Brodsky of My Good Eye and notably features live ants crawling on Greg Weeks, the band's bassist.  It had the honor of being the most played video on MTV2's Headbangers Ball in 2005. "Blue Line Cretin" was directed by acclaimed artist Paul Romano (who designed the "Clients" CD graphics). "Black Santa", again directed by David Brodsky, was shot on location at the notorious Manhattan nightclub, Crobar.  The claymation "battle" between the Antman and Black Santa characters was executed by Randy Gordon-Gatica and conceived of by Guy, Randy and Brodsky.  It was nominated for Best Video of 2006 on MTV2's Headbangers Ball. "Fixation on Plastics" was also shot as a video and is a performance-only video.

Track listing

Personnel

The Red Chord
Brad Fickeisen – drums
Guy Kozowyk – vocals
Mike "Gunface" McKenzie – guitar, backing vocals
Kevin Rampelberg – guitar
Gregory Weeks – bass

Production and design
Zeuss – Producer, engineer, mixer
The Red Chord – co-producer
Alan Douches – mastering
Paul Romano – layout concept and design

References

2005 albums
The Red Chord albums
Metal Blade Records albums
Albums produced by Chris "Zeuss" Harris